1031 Canal was a partially collapsed  multi-use high-rise building in New Orleans, Louisiana, located at 1031 Canal Street in the Central Business District. If completed, the project would have been known as the Hard Rock Hotel New Orleans.

After months of controversy, on September 22, 2011, the New Orleans City Council voted 5–2 to approve the necessary height variances with provisions. The project had undergone a lengthy and controversial development process.

On October 12, 2019, the under-construction building partially collapsed, resulting in the deaths of three workers and injuring dozens of others. The building was subsequently demolished. Government officials are debating the project's future and the potential culpability of various people and organizations involved.

On April 3, 2020, OSHA found that the structural engineer had "failed to adequately design, review or approve steel bolt connections affecting the structural integrity of the building". The engineer has denied wrongdoing and is appealing the findings. Felony charges against three former building inspectors were recommended by the New Orleans Office of Inspector General.

Demolition of former Woolworths store

A permit to demolish the existing building, a former Woolworth store constructed in the 1930s and vacant since the late 1990s, was issued in April 2014, and demolition began in October 2014, with completion scheduled for 2016.

Hard Rock Hotel New Orleans

Following the demolition of the Woolworth building, there was little progress made on the site until February 2018 when Kailas announced a partnership with Hard Rock to turn the new building into the Hard Rock Hotel New Orleans.  The new plan maintained the already-approved height, massing, and general design of the tower.  Plans for the interior then included 350 hotel rooms, 65 1–3 bedroom units available for purchase, an upscale restaurant,  of event space, and a 400-space parking garage.

Partial collapse during construction
On Saturday, October 12, 2019, at approximately 9:12 a.m. during construction, a partial collapse of the structure occurred on the side facing North Rampart Street.  Three workers died and dozens of others were injured.

The cause of the collapse is under investigation.  Some workers and a contractor said they had complained about unsafe practices before the collapse, and one posted a video of what he said was the construction site showing insufficient support for the structure.  Investigators said they would evaluate the information.  New Orleans Mayor LaToya Cantrell called for the entire building to be demolished.

On January 15, 2020, a petition to demolish three neighboring historic buildings was to be considered by the Historic District Landmarks Commission for the Central Business District.  Those structures are located at 1019 and 1027 Canal, and 1022 Iberville Street.  At the time, the collapsed 18-story building had not yet been removed.  Ultimately, the City of New Orleans issued an emergency declaration ordering the demolition of the neighboring 3 structures due to safety concerns with the demolition. A few days earlier, the developer requested a delay in the decision-making process, pending the finalization of the plan as to the methodology for the demolition. The City of New Orleans was advocating for an implosion using explosives without proper insurance, while the developer favored a traditional demolition By April, the developer and the City of New Orleans were in dispute regarding the demolition, with the developer describing code enforcement regarding the demolition as "farcical". In June, demolition of surrounding buildings commenced after the developer was forced to gain approval to conventionally demolish the structure in court over the City of New Orleans who was attempting to implode the building; in August, ten months after the collapse, the bodies of the second and third victims were recovered. After repeated delays due to tropical weather, demolition was expected to be complete by that December; by mid-December the towers were demolished and clearing of debris was underway.

Investigations
The New Orleans inspector general’s office filed a report with the New Orleans district attorney on or about July 28, 2021 recommending felony charges against former city building inspector Julie Tweeter who was supposed to check on work at the Hard Rock Hotel before it collapsed in October 2019.  Inspector General Edward Michel also recommended charges against former city building inspectors Thomas Dwyer and Eric Treadaway in investigation reports submitted to District Attorney Jason Williams.

References

https://www.wwltv.com/mobile/article/news/investigations/hard-rock-criminal-probe-delayed-as-inspector-general-fires-investigator/289-94e61a38-ad6c-45ee-8014-eadcdce1e0a6

External links

 Redevelopment of 1031 Canal St., Official Website
 Archived version 2018
 Firefighters Shield Body Trapped in Rubble of New Orleans Hotel - New York Times, 22 January 2020

Buildings and structures in New Orleans
Proposed skyscrapers in the United States
Building collapses in the United States
Building collapses in 2019